Walter Martins de Oliveira Municipal Airport  is the airport serving Guaíra, Brazil.
 
It is operated by the Municipality of Guaíra under the supervision of Aeroportos do Paraná (SEIL).

History
The airport was closed for renovation between 2010 and 2014.

Airlines and destinations

Access

See also

List of airports in Brazil

References

External links

Airports in Paraná (state)